Medial ligament might refer to:

 Medial arcuate ligament, in one's diaphragm
 Medial collateral ligament, one of the four major ligaments of the knee
 Medial palpebral ligament, near one's nose
 Medial pubovesical ligament, from one's bladder to one's pubis bones
 Medial talocalcaneal ligament, near one's ankle
 Medial umbilical ligament, near an abdominal wall